This is a list of toll roads in the United States (and its territories). Included are current and future high-occupancy toll (HOT) lanes, express toll (ETL) lanes, and hybrid systems. HOV, as used in this article, is high occupancy vehicle.

This list does not include items on the list of toll bridges, list of toll tunnels, nor list of ferry operators.

Alabama

California

Managed lanes

Colorado

Managed lanes

Delaware

Florida

E-ZPass is accepted on all CFX owned roadways. , SunPass is interoperable with E-ZPass; E-ZPass is now accepted on SunPass-compatible roads while SunPass account holders now have the option to obtain a SunPass tag that can be used on E-ZPass toll roads.

Managed lanes
In Florida, all vehicles in managed lanes are required to have a SunPass, E-Pass, E-ZPass, Peach Pass, or NC Quick Pass to use the lanes. The Lee Roy Selmon Express lanes permits Toll by plate travel as well as the use of transponders.

Georgia

Managed lanes
In Georgia, all vehicles in managed lanes are required to have a Peach Pass, NC Quick Pass or SunPass to use the lanes; buses and vanpools are toll-free with a Peach Pass but not with an interoperable pass.

Illinois

Indiana

Kansas

Oklahoma

Louisiana

Maine

Maryland

Managed lanes

Massachusetts

Minnesota

Managed lanes

New Hampshire

New Jersey
On the New Jersey Turnpike, peak hours are from 7:00-9:00 a.m; 4:30-6:30 p.m. Monday-Friday (based on time of entry) and at all times on weekends.

New York

North Carolina
In North Carolina, the NC Quick Pass transponder is accepted and the E-ZPass, Peach Pass, and SunPass transponders are compatible. A Bill by mail option is available to those without a transponder.

Managed lanes

Nevada
 Valley of Fire Road

Ohio

Oklahoma

Pennsylvania

Puerto Rico

Managed lanes

Rhode Island
Due to a federal ruling by U.S. District Judge William Smith on September 21st, 2022 at 11 am, all truck tolls were deactivated statewide by the Rhode Island Department of Transportation at 7 pm on that day.

South Carolina

Texas

Managed lanes

Utah

Managed lanes

Virginia

Managed lanes

Washington

West Virginia

Former

Colorado
 US 36 (Denver–Boulder Turnpike)—tolls removed in 1967.

Connecticut
 I-95 (Gold Star Memorial Bridge)—tolls removed in 1963
 I-291 (Bissell Bridge)—tolls removed in 1989
 US 5/ Route 15 (Charter Oak Bridge)—tolls removed in 1989
 Conn. Turnpike—tolls removed in 1985.
 Route 2A—tolls removed in 1980
 Route 3 (Putnam Bridge)—tolls removed in 1989
 Route 15 (Wilbur Cross Parkway/Merritt Parkway)—tolls removed in 1988.

Georgia
 F.J. Torras Causeway – 30¢ tolls removed in 2003.
 Georgia State Route 400— 50¢ tolls removed in 2013.

Kentucky
 Audubon Parkway—tolls removed in 2006. Currently signed as "Future I-69 Spur".
 Bluegrass Parkway—tolls removed in 1991.
 Cumberland Parkway—tolls removed in 2003.
 Hal Rogers Parkway—tolls removed in 2003.
 Kentucky Turnpike—tolls removed in 1975, by which time it had already been incorporated into I-65.
 Mountain Parkway—tolls removed in 1986.
 Natcher Parkway—tolls removed in 2006. Most of its route is now designated as I-165, with a small section as KY 9007.
 Pennyrile Parkway—tolls removed in 1992. Now designated as I-69, I-169, and US-41.
 Purchase Parkway—tolls removed in 1992. About half of the route is now designated as I-69, with the rest to follow in the coming years.
 Western Kentucky Parkway—tolls removed in 1987. The easternmost  of the road is now designated as I-69; the next  to the east will be designated as I-569 in the coming years.

Maryland
John F. Kennedy Memorial Highway—ramp tolls removed in the 1980s; Tydings Bridge toll remains

New York
 Cross County Parkway—tolls removed in the early 1950s.
 Hutchinson River Parkway—tolls removed in 1994.
 Niagara Thruway – tolls removed in 2006; tolls on Grand Island Bridges remain.
 Saw Mill River Parkway—tolls removed in 1994.
 Southern State Parkway—tolls removed in 1978.

Oregon
 Barlow Road—tolls in effect from 1864 to 1919; no longer a viable route due to the eastern portion being overgrown; most western portions are paved over by modern roads.
 Santiam Wagon Road—tolls in effect from 1861 to 1915.  Closely parallels the route of U.S. Route 20 through the Cascades.

South Carolina
 Cross Island Pkwy (Hilton Head Island)—tolls removed in June 2021.

Texas
 Camino Colombia Toll Road/State Highway 255—tolls removed in 2017
 Dallas-Fort Worth Turnpike—tolls removed in 1978.

Virginia
 Norfolk–Virginia Beach Expressway—tolls removed in 1996.
 Richmond–Petersburg Turnpike—tolls removed in 1992.

Proposals

California
In the San Francisco Bay Area, the transportation authorities are planning a whole network of HOT lanes.
 I-580 Under construction. The portion being constructed is in the Tri-Valley area between Pleasanton and Livermore. The eastbound HOT lane is scheduled to open in 2013, while the westbound HOT lane is scheduled to open in 2014.
 US 101 planned. The areas to be constructed include the total area of the Metropolitan Transportation Commission (San Francisco Bay Area) (MTC), with the exception of the City of San Francisco, the northern approach to the Golden Gate Bridge, and northern San Mateo County.
 I-80 planned. The areas to be constructed include the total MTC area, with the exception of the City of San Francisco, and the approach to the San Francisco–Oakland Bay Bridge.
 SR 4 planned, portions fully funded. The areas to be constructed are from the junction with I-680 to Antioch.
 I-880 planned, portions fully funded. The areas to be constructed go from the south end of Oakland to the junction with US 101.
 SR 92 convert lanes from HOV. The area to be converted is the approach to the San Mateo - Hayward Bridge.
 SR 84 convert lanes from HOV. The area to be converted is from the I-880 intersection to the approach to the Dumbarton Bridge.
 I-280 planned. The areas to be constructed go from the intersection with US 101/I-680 in San Jose to past the intersection with SR 85.
 SR 85 fully funded. The area to be constructed is the entire length with both ends connecting with US 101. Expected to open in 2012.
 SR 87 convert lanes from HOV. The area to be converted is its entire length, from US 101 to SR 85.
 SR 237 extension of already-existing HOT lanes. The area to be constructed is the entire length from I-880 to SR 85. The portion from I-880 and North First St opened in March 2012.

Riverside County is recognized by the California Transportation Commission (CATC) as having a traffic congestion problem second only to Los Angeles.
 SR 91 under construction. Two HOT lanes and a mixed-flow lane from the Orange County line to the intersection with I-15.
 I-15 recommended. Two HOT lanes and a mixed-flow lane from the San Bernardino County line to the intersection with SR 74. Further, an HOV lane and an eventual HOT lane extension to the San Diego County line.

Los Angeles County has a plan in place that has been approved by the California legislature. They have received a grant for $213.6 million from the USDOT (United States Department of Transportation). This plan will be implemented in two phases, although it is currently unknown when those phases will take place.

Both phases are for the conversion of HOV lanes to HOT lanes.
 I-10 phase 2: From I-605 to SR 57/SR 71: in design; from SR-57/SR-71 to the San Bernardino County line.
 I-210 phase 1: Convert the Foothill Freeway from SR 134/SR 710 to I-605. Phase 2: From I-605 to the San Bernardino County line. This plan was dropped as of 2009, according to the Pasadena Star-News, due to San Gabriel Valley leaders opposition.
 SR 60 phase 2: Convert from the intersection with I-605 to Brea Canyon (under construction), and convert from Brea Canyon to the San Bernardino County line.

Florida
A  segment was completed in 2016. The remaining segment is under design, but not yet scheduled for construction.
 SR 690 (Gateway Express)—elevated east–west highway in central Pinellas County. Project approved in 2014. Construction to begin in 2017 & to be completed in 2022.
 Central Polk Parkway—planned, unfunded toll road in Polk County. As of January 2015, the design phase of seven of eight segments has been funded.
 Heartland Parkway—proposed  toll road through interior counties, from southwest of the Orlando metro area to the Fort Myers-Naples area.

Managed lanes
 I-4 (4 Express)—a  four-lane variable tolling lanes along I-4 in Orlando, scheduled to be completed in 2021.  Additional  of variable toll lanes along I-4 currently being studied, which would cover the Orlando metropolitan area.
 I-75 (Palmetto Expressway)/ SR 826—Express lanes are being added along  of I-75 and SR 826 in the Miami area; work began in 2014 and was completed in 2018.
 I-295—Express lanes are being added between I-95 and the St. John's River (Buckman Bridge). Plans for express lanes between State Road 9B and J. Turner Butler Boulevard are being finalized with land acquisition beginning in 2015.
 I-4/ I-75/ I-275—FDOT has proposed constructing a system of express lanes—Tampa Bay Express—along Interstates 275, 4, & 75 in the Tampa Bay area.

Georgia

 I-285, along the northern section of I-285 between the two interchanges with I-20, although it is to be built in three sections:
 West side - between I-75 and I-20 west of Atlanta
 Top end - between I-75 and I-85 north of Atlanta, including direct interchanges with I-75, GA 400, and I-85
 East side - between I-85 and I-20 east of Atlanta
 GA 400, from I-285 going north about 16 miles.

Illinois
 Illiana Expressway—proposed toll road.
 I-490 (O'Hare West Bypass)—this beltway and electronic toll highway should be completed by 2025.

Indiana
 Illiana Expressway—proposed toll road.
 Southern Indiana Toll Road, built as free I-69

Kentucky
 Bert T. Combs Mountain Parkway—Currently toll-free, but tolling has been proposed to pay for plans to expand the current two-lane section from Campton to Salyersville to four lanes, plus extend the road to Prestonsburg.

Louisiana
 Lafayette Regional Xpressway—proposed toll road.
 Baton Rouge Loop—proposed toll road.

Minnesota
MnDOT plans to continue their construction of E-ZPass Express Lanes across the Twin Cities including:
 I-94
 I-494
 US-169
 MN-36
 MN-77
 MN-252

North Carolina
 I‑485 (Express Lanes)—along the Governor James G. Martin Freeway section of I-485, between US 74 (exit 51) and I-77/US 21 (exit 67), in Mecklenburg County.  Construction on the HOT lanes is expected to begin in 2019.
 US 74 (Express Lanes)—along the Independence Boulevard section of US 74, between Brookshire Freeway/John Belk Freeway and Wallace Lane, in Mecklenburg County.  The project involves converting existing Bus lanes.  Anticipated to be completed and ready by end of 2016.
 NC 540 (Triangle Expressway)—proposed southeast extension.
 Mid-Currituck Bridge

Oklahoma
 Kickapoo Turnpike (Construction began in January 2018)

Oregon
 I-5 — replacement for Interstate Bridge between Portland, Oregon, and Vancouver, Washington.
 I-205 — from Stafford Road to Oregon Route 213, including the Abernethy Bridge. Proposed to begin as early as 2024.

Rhode Island
 Interstate 295 (Trucks only)

South Carolina
 I-73—proposed toll road.

Texas
  Cibolo Parkway – proposed F.M. 1103 extension as a toll road south from Weil Road south to I-10 at Zuehl Road in Cibolo, TX (Guadalupe County).
 I-10 (Katy Tollway)—proposed extension of the I-10 HOT lanes, from SH 6 in Harris County to FM 359 in Waller County (under study).
 I-35E (Express Lanes)—planned variable toll lanes, from south of the Loop 12/I-35E split to south of Valwood Parkway, including the reconstruction of existing facilities, construction of frontage roads and the addition of managed lanes.
 I-35W (Express Lanes)—planned variable toll lanes, from Wautauga Ave. to Meacham St. in Fort Worth.
 I-69E—proposed toll road segments located at Riviera and Driscoll.
 Loop 360—proposed future designation of state highway, in Austin.
 Loop 1604 (Express Lanes)—proposed variable tolling lanes in San Antonio.
 SH 35 (Alvin Tollway)—proposed toll road from Bellfort Avenue in Houston to FM 528 in Alvin
 SH 45 (Manchaca Expressway)—planned toll road extension.
 SH 71 (Bastrop Expressway)—proposed toll road in Austin.
 SH 121/ SH 183 (North Tarrant Express)—proposed improvements are planned to include three general purpose lanes in each direction with three HOT lanes in each direction for a total of twelve lanes with frontage roads for future traffic volumes, located in the Fort Worth area.
 SH 249 (Aggie Expressway)—extension of toll road (currently under construction) from FM 1488 in Magnolia to FM 1774 in Todd Mission.
 Trinity Parkway—proposed toll road in Dallas.
 US 281 (Express Lanes)—proposed variable tolling lanes in San Antonio.
 US 290/SH 71 (Oak Hill Expressway)—proposed toll road or variable toll lanes along Oak Hill Expressway, in Austin.

Washington
 I‑405/ SR 167—proposed extension of the SR 167 HOT Lanes and I-405 Express Toll Lanes, from Auburn to Bellevue

West Virginia
 WV 43 (Mon–Fayette Expressway)—currently free on West Virginia portion, but West Virginia reserves the right to impose tolls on its section of the Mon–Fayette Expressway in the future, much like its Pennsylvania counterpart.

Jurisdictions without toll roads

(Toll bridges and toll tunnels that carry roads are not included.)

As of January 2014:
 Alaska
 American Samoa
 Arizona
 Arkansas
 Connecticut
 Georgia
 Guam
 Hawaii
 Idaho
 Iowa
 Kentucky
 Michigan
 Mississippi
 Missouri
 Montana
 Nebraska
 New Mexico
 North Dakota
 Northern Mariana Islands
 Oregon
 South Dakota
 Tennessee
 United States Virgin Islands
 Vermont
 Washington, DC
 Wisconsin
 Wyoming

See also

 List of toll bridges: United States

References

Toll